English-born Australian actress and singer-songwriter Sophie Lowe has released two extended plays (EPs), eight singles and seven music videos.

Lowe self-released her debut EP, EP 1, under the alias SOLO in December 2013 on Bandcamp, she later dropped the SOLO name and performed under her real name and re-released her debut EP on the iTunes Store in October 2015. The lead single of the EP is the song, "Dreaming", with the music video directed by actress Bonnie Wright. The original version of the first track of the EP, "A Runner", was part of the soundtrack of the film, Road Kill, which Lowe co-starred in.

Her second EP, EP 2, was released in November 2015 and included the singles "Understand", "Pink Flowers" and "Breathe".

In August 2016, she released a collaboration with TWINKIDS titled, "Mean" with the music video being directed by Patrick Fileti and herself. In October 2017, she released the single, "Trust". In September 2018. she released the single, "Taught You How To Feel", the music video was directed by Bonnie Wright.

On 11 May 2021, Lowe released the single, "I Don't Want You Around", the music video was directed and edited by herself.

Extended plays

Singles

Other appearances

Music videos

References 



Discographies of Australian artists
Pop music discographies